Arkansas Nuclear One (ANO) is a two-unit pressurized water nuclear power plant located on Lake Dardanelle outside Russellville, Arkansas. Owned by Entergy Arkansas and operated by Entergy Nuclear, it is the only nuclear power facility in Arkansas.

Units

Unit One 
Unit One has a generating capacity of 846 megawatts and came online on May 21, 1974. It is licensed to operate through May 20, 2034. Its nuclear reactor was supplied by Babcock & Wilcox.

Unit Two 
Unit Two has a generating capacity of 930 megawatts and came online on September 1, 1978. It is licensed to operate through July 18, 2038. Its nuclear reactor was supplied by Combustion Engineering. Unit Two is the only one that uses a cooling tower; Unit One releases heat into Lake Dardanelle.

Surrounding population

The 2010 U.S. population within  of Arkansas Nuclear was 44,139, an increase of 17.2 percent in a decade, according to an analysis of U.S. Census data for msnbc.com. The 2010 U.S. population within  was 308,219, an increase of 13.3 percent since 2000. Cities within 50 miles include Russellville (6 miles to city center).

Seismic risk
The Nuclear Regulatory Commission's estimate of the risk each year of an earthquake intense enough to cause core damage to the reactor at Arkansas Nuclear was 1 in 243,902, according to an NRC study published in August 2010.

March 2013 incident

On March 31, 2013, an industrial accident at the facility killed one person and injured eight other workers, including four seriously. The accident took place "in a non-radiation area, and there was no risk to public health and safety." According to Entergy, the old stator of Unit One's generator fell during an operation to replace it. The falling component ruptured a water pipe, causing water infiltration into the plant's switchgear, which knocked out power to all of Unit One and one train of Unit Two's electrical system, which was online at the time. The electrical failure caused an automatic shutdown of Unit Two. The plant's emergency generators started and restored power to the emergency systems of both units. Unit One was in a refueling outage. Emergency diesel generators, water pumps and feed water were functioning following a loss of all off-site power on Unit One, according to the NRC event notification. The plant was placed under an "unusual event classification", which is the lowest of four emergency classification levels for abnormal events designated by the federal Nuclear Regulatory Commission, which regulates American civil nuclear installations. One plant worker died, and ten other injuries required offsite medical treatment. The company released an official statement of condolence. Entergy announced that they would immediately commence repairs to Unit Two and hope to have the unit back online within several weeks. Entergy also acknowledged that Unit One would be offline for an extended time while the company surveyed the damage and established a timeline for repairs.

The cost of the repairs was estimated at $95–120M, not counting additional costs to replace lost electricity from the reactors being down for four months. Both units were repaired, and started up on August 7, 2013 capable of returning to full power.  During the recovery from the incident a specialist engineering company named Lowther-Rolton  assisted with the recovery of the existing Stator and performed a "Technical Audit" (also called a "third-party review") of the engineering for lifting and installation of the new Stator to ensure safety of operations.

December 2013 incident
On December 9, 2013, Unit Two was taken offline due to a transformer fire in the site switchyard. The fire was contained without injuries or threats to safety.

See also

 List of power stations in Arkansas

References

External links 
 Entergy Nuclear - Arkansas Nuclear One
 Arkansas Nuclear One, United States of America
 NukeWorker
 History

Energy infrastructure completed in 1974
Energy infrastructure completed in 1978
Buildings and structures in Pope County, Arkansas
Nuclear power plants in Arkansas
Nuclear power stations using pressurized water reactors
Entergy
Industrial fires and explosions in the United States
2013 disasters in the United States
1974 establishments in Arkansas